Klemens Zamoyski (1738–1767) was a Polish nobleman (szlachcic).

Klemens was the 8th Ordynat of Zamość estate, starost of Płoskirów and Tarnów.

Notes

References

1738 births
1767 deaths
People from Khmelnytskyi, Ukraine
Klemens